Science City Chennai is an autonomous organization established in 1998 under the Department of Higher Education of the Government of Tamil Nadu, India, for the promotion and popularization of science and technology. A agglomeration of more than 60 educational and research institutions in Guindy - Taramani area belonging to both  Central and State Governments has been declared as Science City.

Activities of Science City

Organising hands on Science activities for students
 
Organising Science day celebration 
 
Organising Inter City and Intra City Science Exhibition and science talents contest etc.

Providing Scientific Inputs to Livestock Farmers through Training programmes

Organising Summer Training Programmes in Basic Sciences

Organising Science based programmes for the Differently Abled

Organising the Chennai Science Festival

Honouring eminent Scientists with the Tamil Nadu Lifetime Achievement in Science, Tamil Nadu Senior Scientist Award and the Tamil Nadu Young Scientists Award.

Honouring outstanding projects of School Students with the Children's Science Academy Award

Organising Science Camps

Study Tours

Encouraging scientific co-operation and technological collaboration, visits to other countries and other parts of the country may be facilitated.

Details of Awards 
The Lifetime Achievement is bestowed on eminent scientist above the age of 60. The candidate applying for the award should have carried out exemplary work in the field of science and technology, which would be useful to mankind. The award carries a cash prize and a citation.

The Senior Scientist Award is bestowed on eminent Scientists above the age of 40 and below 60. Proposals will be invited from across the State during the month of December every year and the received proposals will be scrutinised by a high power expert committee. The award carries a cash prize and a citation.

The Young Scientist award is bestowed on Scientist below the age of 40. Proposals will be received from scientists across the state during the month of December and scrutinised by a high power expert committee.  The award carries a cash prize and a citation. This award is conferred on women scientists in order to encourage and motivate women scientists to take up research in Science and Technology.

Children's Science Academy Award is bestowed on school students of classes 9, 10 and 11 submitting outstanding theoretical projects submitted by schools students. The award is given away in 6 disciplines of Science viz., Mathematics, Physics, Chemistry, Biology, Social Sciences and Computer Science / Information technology. The award carries a cash prize and certificate. As a part of the award the students are invited to attend an exclusive science camp for the awardees all expenses borne by the Science City.

Gender and Science.

The Science City established the gender cell with the objective of bringing gender equality and upliftment of women. The gender cell of Science City organises various programmes like Entrepreneur Development Programme (EDP), Entrepreneur Awareness Programme (EAP), workshops, National and International Seminars, International Women's Day Celebrations, Inter college Cultural programmes etc.

See also
 Swami Vivekananda Planetarium, Mangalore
 Science City Kolkata
 Pushpa Gujral Science City, Kapurthala, Punjab, India
 Gujarat Science City, Ahmedabad, Gujarat, India 
 Science City at Union Station, Kansas City, Missouri, United States
 Science Centre, Surat

References

1998 establishments in Tamil Nadu
Educational organisations based in India